The Eisenhower Tunnel, officially the Eisenhower–Edwin C. Johnson Memorial Tunnel, is a dual-bore, four-lane vehicular tunnel in the western United States, approximately  west of Denver, Colorado. The tunnel carries Interstate 70 (I-70) under the Continental Divide in the Rocky Mountains. The tunnel is the longest mountain tunnel and highest point on the Interstate Highway System. Opened in 1973, the westbound bore is named after Dwight D. Eisenhower, the U.S. President for whom the Interstate system is also named. The eastbound bore was completed in 1979 and is named for Edwin C. Johnson, a governor and U.S. Senator who lobbied for an Interstate Highway to be built across Colorado.

Description

At the time of dedication, they were the highest vehicular tunnels in the world.

While the Eisenhower Tunnel remains the highest vehicular tunnel in the US, higher tunnels have since been constructed elsewhere, such as the Fenghuoshan Tunnel, a rail tunnel in China. The Eisenhower tunnel is noted as the longest mountain tunnel and highest point on the Interstate Highway System. The tunnel bores measure . The upper portion of the tunnel is used for forced air ventilation and the space underneath the roadway is used for water transport.

The eastbound portal to the Johnson tunnel has a traffic metering system formed by four lanes of traffic allowed to proceed in alternating pairs of lanes, as controlled by traffic signals.

Height restriction

The trucking industry lobbied the Colorado Department of Transportation (CDOT) to increase the vertical clearance.

Sensors activate audible sirens near each entrance of the tunnel if a vehicle above the posted height attempts to enter the tunnel. Traffic signals at that entrance will turn red, stopping all traffic. The entrance will remain closed until the vehicle is removed from the freeway, sometimes causing severe delays for all traffic. CDOT noted that prior to the retrofit, about 20,000 vehicles per year tripped the alarm. The trucking industry argued that many of these trucks were under the height requirement but tripped the alarm due to their air suspensions (which can be lowered during their journey through the tunnel) or due to snow and ice atop the trailer. During this time, the trucking industry estimated the number of alarms would drop by as much as 80% if the clearance could be raised even a few inches. Another feature of the retrofit monitors truck weight—a safe speed for each truck on the 7% grades and curves just outside the tunnel is calculated and displayed for each driver.

Alternate route

To mitigate the dangers posed by a fire inside the tunnel, trucks hauling hazardous materials are prohibited from using the tunnel. Other than the above exceptions, the tunnel has replaced the pass for general vehicular traffic. While less formidable than the older route, the approach to the tunnel on both sides is steep, and runaway truck ramps are available for truckers who lose control.

During construction or winter storms that require closing Loveland Pass, there is a procedure in place to allow hazardous material trucks to use the tunnel. Once per hour, the tunnel bores will be closed to regular traffic, and the trucks will be guided through the tunnel in a convoy with escorts.

As of December 2009, almost 276 million vehicles had passed through the tunnel. This figure includes a significant number of visitors to Colorado's ski resorts.

History

The idea for a tunnel under Loveland Pass existed since at least the 1950s. William A.H. Loveland had an idea of a tunnel under the divide in 1867, but instead got the wagon road now known as Loveland Pass built.  Serious discussion began when the state of Colorado lobbied for the Interstate Highway System to route a transcontinental highway across Colorado. After a round of negotiations with Utah officials, it was decided the best option was to follow the US Route 6 corridor. Engineers recommended tunneling under the pass, rather than attempt to build a route across conforming to Interstate Highway standards.

The Eisenhower–Johnson Memorial Tunnel was known as the Straight Creek Tunnel during construction, named for the waterway that runs along the western approach to the tunnel. Before the tunnel was dedicated, it was renamed to honor Dwight D. Eisenhower and Edwin C. Johnson. The original Pioneer bore to access the two larger bores was "holed through" in late 1964, after fourteen months.  Construction on the first bore of the tunnel was started on March 15, 1968. Construction efforts suffered many setbacks and the project went well over time and budget. One of the biggest setbacks was the discovery of fault lines in the path of the tunnel that were not discovered during the pilot bores. The first construction contractor went bankrupt excavating rock in this fault zone.  These faults began to slip during construction and emergency measures had to be taken to protect the tunnels and workers from cave-ins and collapses. Despite the best efforts of engineers, three workers were killed boring the first tube and four in boring the second.

Further complicating construction, the boring machines could not work as fast as expected at such high elevations and so the productivity was significantly less than planned. The frustration prompted one engineer to comment, "We were going by the book, but the damned mountain couldn't read."  Though the project was supposed to take three years, the tunnel was not opened to traffic until a March 8, 1973 dedication ceremony by Governor John Love. Initially, the northern Eisenhower bore was used for two-way traffic, with one lane for each direction. The amount of traffic through the tunnel exceeded predictions, and efforts soon began to expedite construction on the southern bore. Construction began on the eastbound Edwin C. Johnson tunnel on August 18, 1975 and finished on December 21, 1979. The initial engineering cost estimate for the Eisenhower bore was $42 million, but the actual cost was $108 million (equivalent to $ million in ). Approximately 90% of the funds were paid by the federal government, with the state of Colorado paying the rest. At the time, it set a record for the most expensive federally aided project. The excavation cost for the Johnson bore was $102.8 million (equivalent to $ million in ). Not included in the figures is about $50 million in non-boring expenses during the construction of both tunnels.

Upon opening, it became the highest-elevation tunnel in the world, taking the title from the Salang Tunnel in Afghanistan.

The tunnel's construction highlighted issues relevant to the feminist movement. When Janet Bonnema applied for a position as an engineering technician with the Colorado Department of Transportation she was given an assignment on the Straight Creek Tunnels project. Her supervisor misread her resume and thought that he was hiring "James." When the supervisor discovered that the department had hired a woman, she was tasked with doing support work from the office. There was opposition to a woman entering the construction site. One supervisor stated that if she entered, "Those workers would flat walk out of that there tunnel and they'd never come back." The workers, most of whom had a mining background, expressed a common superstition that a woman brought bad luck to a mine. One worker insisted, "It's a jinx. I've seen too many die after a woman was in the tunnel." Bonnema sued the department for the right to work inside the tunnel. She countered she was in better shape and more agile than most of the men who were working on the tunnel. Emboldened by the passage of an equal rights law in Colorado, she finally entered the tunnel, with an entourage of reporters, on November 9, 1972. Some workers walked off the job, and at least one of them yelled, "Get those women out of here." She remained determined and re-entered the tunnel a few days later. The next time, she dressed in coveralls and was even assigned tasks on the roof of the tunnel overlooking the men below. Surprised that nobody had apparently noticed that she was a woman, she stated, "I had a good disguise." Bonnema continued to dress in coveralls during her subsequent work in the tunnel so as not to attract attention.

Plane crash during construction

On Friday, October 2, 1970, during the tunnel's construction, workers constructing the tunnel were among the first on scene of a plane crash that had occurred less than 2 miles (3 km) northeast of the east portal. A Martin 4-0-4 charter aircraft, one of two carrying the college football team of Wichita State University, crashed just north of the highway. Of the 40 passengers and crew on board, only nine survived. The team was on its way to a game with Utah State University in Logan and had recently refueled at Denver's Stapleton International Airport. The plane carrying the team's starters departed Denver and traveled a poorly planned scenic route. The other plane, carrying reserve players, followed the original route and landed safely in Logan.

Water diversion
As with the Moffat Tunnel, while the Eisenhower Tunnel was primarily intended as a transportation tunnel, it also serves as a water tunnel for water diversion from the western side of the Continental Divide to the eastern side.  Water from the Straight Creek watershed (a tributary of the Blue River), along with all seepage entering the tunnel, is discharged into Clear Creek for delivery to the Coors Brewing Company.  Typically, the tunnel delivers over 300 acre-feet (370,000 m3) of water per year.

See also
 Lists of tunnels
 Moffat Tunnel, the equivalent for rail traffic, opened in 1928
 Salang Tunnel, another among the highest vehicular tunnels at altitude , in Afghanistan

References

External links

 Eisenhower Tunnel by Colorado Department of Transportation
 Eisenhower Tunnel traffic camera by Colorado Department of Transportation

1973 establishments in Colorado
Interstate 70
Road tunnels in the United States
Transportation buildings and structures in Clear Creek County, Colorado
Transportation buildings and structures in Summit County, Colorado
Tunnels completed in 1973
Tunnels completed in 1979
Tunnels in Colorado